There's No Sky (Oh My My) is the first full-length album by indie rock band Jaill. Originally released under the name Jail. The album had a very limited release in 2009 as a "small-press hand made copy". It would later be reissued on Burger Records in 2010, on both cassette and vinyl formats.

Track listing

References

2009 debut albums
Jaill albums